The Hopfner HV-4/28 was a small airliner built in Austria in the late 1920s. An enlarged version of the HV-3/27, it was a conventional, high-wing cantilever monoplane with a fully enclosed cabin. A single example was built in 1928 and saw heavy use by the airline that year. In 1929, it received a major refurbishment that included a change or powerplant from the original Heiro to a Gnome et Rhône 9A Jupiter engine and was sold to a private owner under the new designation HV-8/29GR. This aircraft was still flying at the time of the Anschluß, after which it received a new German registration.

Specifications (HV-4/28)

References

External links
 Уголок неба

1920s Austrian airliners
Hopfner aircraft
Aircraft first flown in 1929
High-wing aircraft
Single-engined tractor aircraft